The British Judo Association (BJA) is the governing body for the Olympic Sport of Judo in the United Kingdom. In 2019 there were 35,000 members. 

The BJA represents the United Kingdom internationally and is a member of the International Judo Federation, the European Judo Union, the Judo Confederation of the European Union, the British Olympic Association, the Central Council of Physical Recreation, and the Commonwealth Judo Association. It is recognised by the United Kingdom Sports Council, Sport England, Sport Wales, the Sports Council for Northern Ireland, Sport Scotland, and the British Olympic Association.

History 
On 24 July 1948 the BJA held its first Management Committee Meeting at the Imperial College Union, at which time the BJA was established as the national body representing Judo in the United Kingdom.

Affiliates
The BJA has three home nation subsidiaries: JudoScotland, the Welsh Judo Association and the Northern Ireland Judo Federation.

In addition to these, two independent membership organisations, the British Judo Council (BJC) and the Amateur Judo Association (AJA) affiliated to the BJA in the late 1990s.

See also
 Judo in the United Kingdom
 Gunji Koizumi

References

External links
 British Judo Association Official Website
 British Judo Association's Guide to the Technical Grading Syllabus 

1948 establishments in the United Kingdom
Judo in the United Kingdom
Judo organizations
National members of the International Judo Federation
Organisations based in Leicestershire
Sport in Leicestershire
Sport in Loughborough
Judo
Sports organizations established in 1948